Augustus Stephen Broughton (29 April 1904 – 22 September 1981) was a Welsh rugby union number 8 who played club rugby for Treorchy and Penarth and was capped twice for Wales.

International matches played
Wales
  New South Wales Waratahs 1927
  1929

Bibliography

References

Wales international rugby union players
Welsh rugby union players
Rugby union number eights
1904 births
1981 deaths
Welsh police officers
Treorchy RFC players
Treherbert RFC players
Penarth RFC players
Glamorgan Police RFC players
Glamorgan Police officers
Rugby union players from the Vale of Glamorgan